The 2013 Asian Archery Championships was the 18th edition of the event. It was held in Taipei, Taiwan from 29 October to 2 November 2013 and was organized by Asian Archery Federation.

Medal summary

Recurve

Compound

Medal table

See also
 List of sporting events in Taiwan

References

 Medalists

External links
 Official website 

2013 in archery
2013 in Taiwanese sport
International sports competitions hosted by Taiwan
Asian Archery Championships
Archery competitions in Taiwan